Ann Phelan (born 16 September 1961) is a former Irish Labour Party politician who served as a Minister of State from 2014 to 2016. She served as a Teachta Dála (TD) for the Carlow–Kilkenny constituency from 2011 to 2016.

Political career
Phelan was elected to Kilkenny County Council in 2004 and 2009 for the Thomastown local electoral area.

Phelan was first elected as a Labour Party TD for the Carlow–Kilkenny constituency at the 2011 general election.

On 15 July 2014, she was appointed by the Fine Gael–Labour coalition government as Minister of State at the Department of Agriculture, Food and the Marine and at the Department of Transport, Tourism and Sport with special responsibility for rural economic development and rural transport. Her responsibilities included the implementation of the 2014 report by the Commission for the Economic Development of Rural Areas (CEDRA).

Before the 2016 general election she participated in a live radio debate on KCLR 96FM. While there she got into an argument, saying: "I am just going to give up here now. I came to this debate here tonight, I came in here, I've been completely ignored and I'll tell you now I'm fed up of the whole bloody lot of ye." Then she walked out of the studio. She admitted later that she had "absolutely" lost her temper.

She lost her seat at the 2016 general election.

References

 

1961 births
Living people
Labour Party (Ireland) TDs
Local councillors in County Kilkenny
Members of the 31st Dáil
21st-century women Teachtaí Dála
Ministers of State of the 31st Dáil
Women ministers of state of the Republic of Ireland
Alumni of Waterford Institute of Technology